Varco may refer to:

 NOV Inc., a multinational oil corporation, owner of the Varco brand
 Varco, Minnesota, an unincorporated community in the United States
 Percy Varco (1904–1982), English footballer

See also